The Archbishop's Palace of Paris was the residence of the Archbishop of Paris, located just south of the Notre Dame de Paris.

It was built in 1161 and destroyed in 1831.

History
It began as the bishop's residence for Maurice de Sully in 1161. The bishopric was elevated to an archbishopric in 1622, and in 1697 the palace was entirely rebuilt by Cardinal de Noailles, except for the chapel, which was still existed in 1830. During the French Revolution of 1789, the Constituent Assembly held meetings in it. Afterwards it was inhabited by the chief surgeon of the city's main hospital, the Hôtel Dieu. The chapel, the oldest structure in the complex, became an amphitheatre of anatomy. In 1802 it was restored to the clergy, and Cardinal de Belloy took up residence in it. The palace was destroyed by a revolutionary mob on 13 February 1831.

Project of Viollet-le-Duc
In 1859, during the period of the Second French Empire, the architect Eugène Viollet-le-Duc drew up plans for the construction of a new palace on the northeast side of the cathedral, but they were never carried out.

Notes

Bibliography
 Galignani, Anthony (1830). "Palais Archiépiscopal", pp. 206–209, in Galignani's New Paris Guide, July 1830. Paris: A. and W. Galignani.
 Galignani, Anthony (1853). "Archbishop's Palace", pp. 338–339, in Galignani's New Paris Guide, for 1853 (at Internet Archive). Paris: A. and W. Galignani and Co.

Episcopal palaces of the Catholic Church
Île de la Cité
Palaces in Paris
Buildings and structures in the 4th arrondissement of Paris
Demolished buildings and structures in Paris
Buildings and structures demolished in 1831
1161 establishments in Europe
1060s establishments in France